Farewell Creek is a watercourse in Durham County, that empties into Lake Ontario, at Oshawa, Ontario.

To the west and east it borders Oshawa Creek, and Bowmanville Creek, which have their headwaters in the Oak Ridges Moraine.

References

Rivers of the Regional Municipality of Durham